Donald Anthony Nash (born 29 March 1978 in Dubbo, New South Wales) is an Australian first-class cricketer who played for the New South Wales Blues.

A right arm fast medium bowler and hard hitting lower order batsman, Nash made his first class debut in 1999-2000. In his 37-game career he took 99 wickets at 31.06 including two hauls of seven wickets in an innings. With the bat he once scored the second fastest half-century in the history of domestic one-day cricket in Australia.

See also
 List of New South Wales representative cricketers

External links
 

1978 births
Living people
Australian cricketers
New South Wales cricketers
People from Dubbo
Cricketers from New South Wales